Hanna Stanek-Lisowska (stage name: Hanna Stankówna; 4 May 1938 – 14 December 2020) was a Polish film and stage actress.

Awards
Hanna Stankówna was awarded the following decorations:
1995: Gold Cross of Merit
1988: Honorary badge "Zasłużony dla Teatru Polskiego w Warszawie" ("For the Merits to the Polish Theatre in Warsaw")
1987: Silver Cross of Merit
 1986: Medal of the 40th Anniversary of the People's Republic of Poland

Notes

References

1938 births
2020 deaths
Polish film actresses
Polish stage actresses
Recipients of the Gold Cross of Merit (Poland)